Saint-Julien-de-Gras-Capou (Languedocien: Sant Jolian de Gras Capon) is a commune in the Ariège department in southwestern France.

Population
Inhabitants are called Saint-Julianois.

See also
Communes of the Ariège department

References

Communes of Ariège (department)
Ariège communes articles needing translation from French Wikipedia